Thomas Jenkinson (by 1527 – 1554 or later) was an English politician.

He was a Member (MP) of the Parliament of England for Leicester in April 1554.

References

Year of death missing
English MPs 1554
Year of birth uncertain